Ferré is a surname. Notable people with the surname include:

In arts and entertainment 
 Boulou Ferré (born 1951), French virtuoso jazz musician
 Géant Ferré ("Iron Giant"), ring name of French-American wrestler André Roussimoff (1946–1993)
 Gianfranco Ferré (1944–2007), Italian fashion designer
 Helen Aguirre Ferré (born 1957), American journalist
 Juan Francisco Ferré (born 1962), Spanish writer, critic and academic
 Léo Ferré (1916–1993), French-born Monégasque poet and composer
 Manuel García Ferré (1929–2013), Spanish-Argentine animation director and cartoonist
 Marc Ferré (born 1994), Andorran footballer
 Maties Palau Ferré (1921–2000), Spanish painter
 Norbert Ferré (born 1975), French magician and artist manager
 Rosario Ferré (1938–2016), Puerto Rican writer, poet and essayist

In politics 
 Jean-Baptiste Ferré (1767–1828), Canadian politician
 José Ferré (1903–1990), Puerto Rican industrialist and politician
 Don Luis Alberto Ferré Aguayo (1904–2003), Puerto Rican industrialist and politician
 Maurice Ferré (born 1935), former mayor of Miami
 Théophile Ferré (1846–1871), member of the Paris Commune

In other fields 
 Alberto Methol Ferré (1929–2009), Uruguayan thinker, writer, journalist, teacher, historian and theologian
 Antonio Luis Ferré, Puerto Rican businessman
 Frederick Ferré (1933–2013), American professor of philosophy
 Isolina Ferré (1914–2000), Puerto Rican Roman Catholic religious sister
 Jean Ferré (1929–2006), French art historian and journalist

See also 
 BAP Ferré (DM-74), a Peruvian Navy destroyer
 Ferré Foundation, a philanthropic organisation
 Le Ferré, a commune in Brittany, France
 Pizzo Ferrè, an Italian mountain
 Réseau Ferré de France, a French railway network

Catalan-language surnames
Surnames of French origin